The 1978 Fort Lauderdale Strikers season was the second season of the Fort Lauderdale Striker's team, and the club's twelfth season in professional soccer.  This year the team were a finalist in the North American Soccer League American Conference.

Background

Review

Competitions

Friendlies

NASL regular season

Results summaries

Results by round

Match reports

NASL Playoffs

Conference Quarterfinals

Conference semifinals
In 1978, if a playoff series was tied after two games, a 30 minute, golden goal, mini-game was played. If neither team scored in the mini-game, they would move on to a shoot-out to determine a series winner. *Teams were re-seeded for the Conference Semifinals based on regular season point totals. This affected only one of the four series; Tampa Bay versus San Diego.

Conference Championships

Bracket

Match reports

Statistics

Transfers

See also 
1978 Fort Lauderdale Strikers

References 

1978
Fort Lauderdale Strikers
Fort Lauderdale
Fort Lauderdale Strikers